The 1903 Buchtel football team represented Buchtel College in the 1903 college football season. The team was led by first-year head coach Alfred W. Place, in his only season. Buchtel was outscored by their opponents by a total of 0–43.

Schedule

References

Buchtel
Akron Zips football seasons
College football winless seasons
Buchtel football